The Indy Japan 300 presented by Bridgestone was an Indy Racing League IndyCar Series race held at Twin Ring Motegi in Motegi, Japan. The 2008 race marked the historic first ever win for a woman driver in American open wheel racing when Danica Patrick of Andretti-Green Racing took the checkered flag.

The first American open-wheel race in Japan was held in 1966 at Fuji Speedway. Jackie Stewart won the Fuji Japan 200, which was held as an exhibition race, and no championship points were awarded. USAC did not return.

For a short period in the late 1980s and early 1990s the CART series explored the prospects of holding a race in Japan. Possible locations would be either Suzuka, Fuji, or a street course in another city. The FIA objected, citing conflicts with Formula One and other interests. In addition, rules were put into place requiring that any CART race outside of North America be held on an oval. Despite the objections, in 1991 CART made their first trip across the Pacific Ocean, and held a street race at Surfer's Paradise, Australia. The plans for a race in Japan were scrapped.

In 1994, Honda joined the CART series, and by 1996, was widely successful. Interest in holding a race in Japan resurfaced, and upon the completion of the Twin Ring Motegi oval, a race was first held in 1998 without FIA objection. The race continued as a Champ Car event through 2002. In 2003, Honda switched alliances to the Indy Racing League, and the race became an Indycar Series event.  On February 9, 2011, it was announced that the series would not return to Motegi for the 2012 season.

Scheduling
From 2003-2006, the race marked the final IRL race before the Indianapolis 500. The extended travel time required typically found the race held the weekend before or after Easter, leaving one or two weeks of travel and rest time until practice began at Indianapolis in early May. This situation was widely unpopular for fans, and for television, because it left a large gap in the schedule, and disrupted continuity leading to the series' premier event. In 2007, the race at Kansas Speedway was moved immediately after Motegi to be the race preceding the Indianapolis 500.

In 2008, following the open wheel unification, the race served as part of the unique "doubleheader" weekend with the Grand Prix of Long Beach. Existing IRL teams raced at Motegi, and former Champ Car teams raced at Long Beach. For 2009, in an effort to reorganize the IndyCar schedule, the race was moved to September (swapping with the MotoGP event) on the Respect-for-the-Aged Day and autumnal equinox public holidays, also kept for 2010.

Following the 2011 earthquake and tsunami in Japan, it was announced that the 2011 event would be moved to the 2.98 mile road course (used by MotoGP) due to damage to the oval. The 2011 event was the final running, a decision made before, and unrelated to, the earthquake and tsunami.

Past winners

Notes 
Qualifying record: Dan Wheldon 201.165 mph (323.743 km/h), 2004
Race record: Dan Wheldon 166.114 mph (267.334 km/h), 2004
2008: Held on same day as Long Beach Grand Prix due to scheduling conflict as a result of reunification.
2011: Race held on road course due to track damage on the oval from the earthquake.

See also
 Japanese Grand Prix

References

External links
Indy Japan 300 Official Site 
Champ Car Stats

Indy Japan 300
Recurring sporting events established in 1998
Recurring sporting events disestablished in 2011